Jerzy Gryt (24 July 1921 – 27 May 2010) was a Polish wrestler. He competed in the men's Greco-Roman middleweight at the 1952 Summer Olympics.

References

External links
 

1921 births
2010 deaths
Polish male sport wrestlers
Olympic wrestlers of Poland
Wrestlers at the 1952 Summer Olympics
Sportspeople from Katowice